This is a list of Renaissance commentators on the works of Aristotle, particularly those on natural philosophy and ethics.

List
Donato Acciaiuoli
Alessandro Achillini
Blasius of Parma
Lodovico Boccadifero
Simon Brossier
Antonio Brucioli
António de Gouveia
Francesco Buonamici
Joachim Camerarius
John Case
Giulio Castellani
Juan de Celaya
Josse Clichtove
Gasparo Contarini
Luis Coronel
Sebastian Couto
Gilbert Crab
Cesare Cremonini
Petrus Crockaert
Petrus Ramus
Johannes Dullaert
Nicolas Dupuy
Johannes Eck
Felice Figliucci

Pedro da Fonseca
George of Brussels
Hubert van Giffen
Emmanuel de Goes
Johannes Herbetius
Crisostomo Javelli
Denys Lambin
Giulio Landi
Gaspar Lax
Jacques Lefèvre d'Étaples
Raffaele Maffei
Johannes Magirus
John Mair
John of St Thomas

Antonius a Matre Dei
Marc-Antoine Muret
Giulio Pace
Paul of Venice
Philipp Melanchthon
Antonio Montecatini
Agostino Nifo 
Benito Pereira
Giovanni Pico
Francesco Piccolomini
Pietro Pomponazzi
Giovanni Pontano
Francis Robortello
Antonio Rubio de Rueda
Jakob Schegk
Domingo de Soto
Ciriaco Strozzi
Francisco Suarez
Antonius Sylvester
Audomarus Talaeus (Omer Talon)
Petrus Tartaretus
Nicolaus Taurellus
Gaetano da Thiene
Alvarus Thomaz
Frans Titelmans
Franciscus Toletus 
Francisco Vallés
Paulus Vallius (Paolo Valla)
Pietro Martire Vermigli
Nicoletto Vernia
Johannes Versor
Jacopo Zabarella
Marcantonio Zimara
Diego de Zúñiga
Theodor Zwinger

See also
Scholastic philosophy
List of Renaissance humanists
List of writers influenced by Aristotle
List of medieval Latin commentators on Aristotle

References
 The Cambridge History of Renaissance Philosophy

Lists of Renaissance people

Renaissance philosophy
Commentators on Aristotle
 
Renaissance commentators on Aristotle